Charles William Wren (15 November 1856 – 19 April 1934) was an Australian banker. Wren was born in North Adelaide, South Australia and died in Italy.

Wren became the accountant and branch inspector for the English, Scottish and Australian Bank for South Australia in 1881. He moved to Melbourne in 1888 as inspector's accountant. He was appointed resident inspector in New South Wales in 1901, and became the bank's Australasian general manager in July 1909.

See also

 Andrew Fisher
 Sir Denison Samuel King Miller

References

Australian bankers
1856 births
1934 deaths
People from Adelaide